Rashid Rakhmatulovich Gallakberov (born 12 April 1966) is a retired Russian professional footballer.

Club career
He played 3 seasons in the Soviet Top League for Lokomotiv Moscow

Honours
 Soviet Cup finalist: 1990.

External links
 

Soviet footballers
Russian footballers
Russian expatriate footballers
Expatriate footballers in Slovakia
Russian expatriate sportspeople in Slovakia
FC Lokomotiv Moscow players
FC Asmaral Moscow players
FC Saturn Ramenskoye players
1. FC Tatran Prešov players
1966 births
Living people
Footballers from Moscow
Association football midfielders
FC FShM Torpedo Moscow players
Soviet Top League players
FC Torpedo Vladimir players